Romaška is a Lithuanian language family name, which comes from mayweed (Romashka). It may refer to:

Gediminas Romaška (born 1955), Lithuanian politician
Nijolė Romaškienė (born 1955), Lithuanian politician
Giedrė Romaškienė (born 1980), Lithuanian school headmaster
Petras Romaška (born 1979), Works in Lithuanian army.

 
Lithuanian-language surnames